The Guiyang–Nanning high-speed railway is a high-speed railway between Guiyang and Nanning in China. Travel time between the two cities will be cut from 10 hours to 2.5 when the railway opens in 2023. It will be part of the Baotou (Yinchuan)–Hainan corridor.

History
Construction on the railway began in 2018.

Route
The line will establish a second route between Longdongbao and Duyun East, before leaving the existing Guiyang–Guangzhou high-speed railway.

References

High-speed railway lines in China
High-speed railway lines under construction